Spectrum Center may refer to:
 Spectrum Center (arena), home of the National Basketball Association's Charlotte Hornets
 Spectrum Center (community center), at the University of Michigan

See also
 Spectrum (arena), a now-demolished arena in Philadelphia